Mohammed Javed Pirzada is an Indian politician belonging to the Indian National Congress. He is a three-time MLA representing Wankaner constituency in Gujarat, having won in 2007, 2012 and 2017. Prior to joining politics, Pirzada was a school principal. He lost his first election contest in 2002. He has obtained BA and B. Ed. degrees from the Saurashtra University. In 2018, Pirzada was appointed a member of the Gujarat State Waqf Board, a body responsible for properties donated for religious or charitable purposes as recognized by Muslim Law.

Pirzada comes from a prominent local family. His father Abdul Pirzada and two brothers Manzoor Pirzada and Khurshid Pirzada have also served as representatives from Wankaner in the Gujarat Vidhan Sabha.

References

Living people
Year of birth missing (living people)
Gujarat MLAs 2017–2022
Gujarat MLAs 2012–2017
Gujarat MLAs 2007–2012
Indian National Congress politicians from Gujarat
People from Morbi district